The 1976 Northern Arizona Lumberjacks football team was an American football team that represented Northern Arizona University (NAU) as a member of the Big Sky Conference (Big Sky) during the 1975 NCAA Division II football season. In their second year under head coach Joe Salem, the Lumberjacks compiled an 8–3 record (4–2 against conference opponents), outscored opponents by a total of 249 to 184, and finished third out of seven teams in the Big Sky.

The team's statistical leaders included Herb Daniel with 1,314 passing yards, Carl Golden with 731 rushing yards, Tyrone Peterson with 519 receiving yards, Tom Jurich with 45 points scored, and Jerry Lumpkin with 135 tackles.

The team played its home games at Lumberjack Stadium in Flagstaff, Arizona.

Schedule

References

Northern Arizona
Northern Arizona Lumberjacks football seasons
Northern Arizona Lumberjacks football